Israel Mukuamu (born November 28, 1999) is an American football safety for the Dallas Cowboys of the National Football League (NFL). He was selected by the Cowboys in the sixth round of the 2021 NFL Draft. He played college football at South Carolina.

Early years
Mukuamu grew up in Moncks Corner, South Carolina and originally attended Berkeley Senior High School. As a junior, he helped turn the team into a winning program with a 9-3 record.

His family moved to Bossier City, Louisiana before his senior year and transferred to Parkway High School. As a senior, he received All-Southwest Region honors.

He originally committed to play college football at Florida State University, but de-committed after head coach Jimbo Fisher left for Texas A&M University and opted to attend the University of South Carolina instead.

College career
As a true freshman in 2018, Mukuamu played in all 13 games with 2 starts, making 17 tackles, two tackles for loss, one interception, one pass broken up and a forced fumble. His first start came at safety in the twelfth game against the University of Akron.

As a sophomore in 2019, he was named the starter at safety for the season opener, before being moved to right cornerback opposite future NFL player Jaycee Horn. He received second-team All-SEC honors after finishing with 13 starts, 59 tackles (2 for loss), four interceptions (led the team) and 9 pass breakups. He had a standout game in the 20-17 upset win against the third ranked University of Georgia, collecting 11 tackles and 3 interceptions, including one returned for a 53-yard touchdown. He received National Defensive Player of the Week honors for his effort.

As a junior in 2020, Mukuamu played in 6 games with 5 starts at both cornerback and safety. He was limited with a recurring groin injury, recording 10 tackles and 2 interceptions (tied for the team lead). He had a highlight one-handed interception against the University of Florida. On November 17, 2020, following the dismissal of head coach Will Muschamp, Mukuamu opted out of the remainder 3 games of the season to focus on his preparation for the 2021 NFL Draft. He finished his college career after appearing in 31 games with 19 starts, while making 86 tackles, 7 interceptions and 10 pass breakups.

Professional career

Mukuamu was selected by the Dallas Cowboys in the sixth round (227th overall) of the 2021 NFL Draft, with the intention of playing him at safety. He signed his four-year rookie contract on May 13, 2021.

Personal life
His father Muana “Charles” Mukuamu was born in the Democratic Republic of the Congo and competed in Judo.

References

External links
South Carolina Gamecocks bio
Mukuamu Brand

1999 births
Living people
American football cornerbacks
American people of Republic of the Congo descent
Sportspeople of Republic of the Congo descent
African-American players of American football
Dallas Cowboys players
People from Moncks Corner, South Carolina
Players of American football from South Carolina
South Carolina Gamecocks football players
Sportspeople from Bossier City, Louisiana
21st-century African-American sportspeople